The M74 tank recovery vehicle (M74) was an engineer vehicle used by the U.S. Army in the 1950s. It was designed to cope with the heavier weights of the M26 Pershing and M47 Patton. It could also be suitable for light dozing, since it had a hydraulic, front-mounted spade. More than 1000 were produced by Bowen-McLaughlin-York by converting M4A3 Sherman tanks starting in 1954. Later, some were converted from M32B1 ARVs by Rock Island Arsenal until 1958.

Development 
After the Korean War the M74 was designed to cope with the heavier weights of the new vehicles that were being introduced.

Designed in 1953, it was based on the M4A3 HVSS medium tank and it was developed to cope with the heavier M26 Pershing and M47 Patton tanks which were entering service, which the M32 Armored Recovery Vehicle (ARV) was unable to retrieve. Using the standard Ford GAA and wide tracks, the chassis would be rebuilt. It was replaced in service with the U.S. Army by the M88 Hercules.

Design 
The M74 was fitted with a main  hydraulic winch, a lighter-duty general purpose secondary winch, a hydraulic A-frame, and a hydraulic front-mounted spade, which was suitable for light dozing, as well as serving as an anchor for heavy winching operations. It had a .50-caliber M2 machine gun atop the hull and a .30-cal M1919A4 machine gun in the right bow.

Production 

Over 1000 M74 ARVs were produced between 1953 to 1955 by Bowen-McLaughlin-York. The conversion of M4A3 Sherman tanks into M74 recovery vehicles was started by Bowen in 1954. Some were also converted from obsolete M32B1 ARVs by Rock Island Arsenal until 1958.

Operators 
  – Used in post-World War II Germany. It was the standard recovery vehicle of the U.S. Army in the 1950s.
  - Used in 1954-198x, 56 in 1976
 
 
  – Used in the Yom-Kippur War
  – Lent by the United States from 1953 to 1968.
  –  Operated 13 units, probably from the United States, were replaced in the 1980s by 8 M88A1/A2G.
  - some received during the Informbiro period

See also 
 List of U.S. military vehicles by model number
 List of U.S. military vehicles by supply catalog designation (SNL G281)
 M4 Sherman variants

Notes

References 
 TM 9-7402 M74 Recovery Vehicle (1956)
 TM 9-7403-2 M74 Recovery Vehicle Misc. Components (1956)

External links 

 M74 Tank Recovery Vehicle – Primeportal.net

Armoured recovery vehicles of the United States
Tracked armoured recovery vehicles
M4 Sherman tanks
Military vehicles introduced in the 1950s
ja:M32 戦車回収車#M74 戦車回収車